Kazakhstan has participated in the Junior Eurovision Song Contest every year since their debut in . Khabar Agency (KA), an associate member organisation of the European Broadcasting Union (EBU), is responsible for the country's participation in the contest. The 2018 contest marked the first time that Kazakhstan has participated in any Eurovision event.

History
On 25 November 2017, Channel 31 of Kazakhstan revealed their intention to participate in the Junior Eurovision Song Contest 2018. Initial claims emerged on 22 December 2017 from both the Kazakh Minister of Culture and Sports, Arystanbek Muhamediuly; and the Director General of Channel 31, Bagdat Kodzhahmetov; that Kazakhstan had applied to become a member of the EBU, with the hope of participating both in the Eurovision Song Contest and the Junior Eurovision Song Contest. Kodzhahmetov invited Daneliya Tuleshova, winner of the fourth season of Ukraine's version of The Voice Kids, to take part in the casting process to represent Kazakhstan in the Junior Eurovision Song Contest. The next day, however, the EBU made a statement rejecting the possibility of Kazakhstan becoming an active member of the EBU, owing to the fact that Kazakhstan is neither within the European Broadcasting Area nor the Council of Europe.

Channel 31 also stated its intention to broadcast the contest in 2018 and 2019. Khabar Agency has been an associate member of the European Broadcasting Union (EBU) since January 2016.

On 25 July 2018, the Kazakhstan's national broadcaster Khabar Agency announced that they would be making their Junior Eurovision debut at the 2018 contest in Minsk, Belarus. The country was represented by the song "Ózińe sen" performed by Daneliya Tuleshova, placing sixth in a field of 20 songs with 171 points.

It was announced on 18 July 2019 that Kazakhstan will participate in the 2019 contest in Gliwice. In late July 2019, Yerzhan Maksim was internally chosen as the second entrant for Kazakhstan. His song, "Armanyńnan qalma", ended up in 2nd place in a field of 19 countries, receiving 227 points.

Maksim's success was repeated in the 2020 contest in Warsaw, where Karakat Bashanova, with song "Forever", placed 2nd with 152 points.

In 2021, Kazakhstan was represented by Alinur Khamzin and Beknur Zhanibekuly, who managed to achieve another top 10 result for the country: 8th place in a field of 19 countries, receiving 121 points.

Future
Since Khabar Agency is an associate member of the EBU, it will still need a special invitation from the contest organisers in future editions.

Participation overview 

Commentators and spokespersons

See also
 Kazakhstan in the ABU TV Song Festival – A televised song gala organised by the Asia-Pacific Broadcasting Union (ABU).
 Kazakhstan in the Eurovision Song Contest – A song competition organised by the European Broadcasting Union (EBU).
 Kazakhstan in the Intervision Song Contest – An international song contest for both Post-Soviet states and members of the Shanghai Cooperation Organisation.
 Kazakhstan in the Turkvision Song Contest – A contest for countries and regions which are of Turkic-speaking or Turkic ethnicity.

References

 
Kazakhstan
Eurovision